Carposina pinarodes is a moth in the family Carposinidae. It was described by Edward Meyrick in 1910. It is endemic in Australia, where it has been first recorded from Western Australia.

References

Carposinidae
Moths described in 1910
Moths of Australia